Stabat is a town in North Sumatra province of Indonesia and it is the seat (capital) of Langkat Regency. The town lies on the road between Medan and Banda Aceh, a short distance past the city of Binjai.

Stabat District is one of the 23 districts of Langkat Regency. Its capital is the town of Stabat. It is bordered by Wampu District to the west, Secanggang District to the north, Binjai to the south, and Hamparan Perak District of Deli Serdang Regency to the east. It covers an area of 108.85 km2 and had a population of 81,971 at the 2010 Census, which had risen to 88,734 according to the official estimate for mid 2019.

Stabat has been since the Dutch colonial period a centre of government.

Climate
Stabat has a tropical rainforest climate (Af) with heavy rainfall year-round.

References

Langkat Regency
Populated places in North Sumatra
Regency seats of North Sumatra